Barry Ross Posen (born July 13, 1952) is Ford International Professor of Political Science at MIT and the director of MIT's Security Studies Program.  An expert in the field of security studies, he currently serves on the editorial boards of the journals International Security and Security Studies and is a member of the Council on Foreign Relations and served as a study group member for the Hart-Rudman Commission.

Posen received his B.A. from Occidental College in 1974 and his M.A. and PhD, under Kenneth Waltz, from the University of California, Berkeley in 1976 and 1981 respectively. Posen worked as a consultant for the RAND Corporation and an analyst for the Department of Defense and Center for Strategic and International Studies before becoming an assistant professor of political science at Princeton University in 1984.  In 1987, he joined MIT as associate professor of political science and has taught at MIT since that time.  He has also served as a consultant to the Woodrow Wilson Center, The Christian Science Monitor and the MacArthur Foundation.

Posen is the author of three books. Posen has also published a number of highly influential journal articles, including "The Security Dilemma and Ethnic Conflict" and "Command of the Commons: The Military Foundations of U.S. Hegemony." In addition to his scholarly work, Posen has frequently appeared in the media and published general interest articles in publications including The New York Times,  The Boston Globe, and The American Interest.

Publications

The Sources of Military Doctrine
Posen's first book, The Sources of Military Doctrine: France, Britain, and Germany Between the World Wars, was published by Cornell University Press in 1984. The Sources of Military Doctrine focuses on how military doctrine is formed and how it shapes grand strategy. The book won the 1984 Edgar S. Furniss Book Award from the Mershon Center for International Security Studies and the 1985 Woodrow Wilson Foundation Award, given annually by the American Political Science Association to the "best book on government, politics or international affairs."

Inadvertent Escalation
Posen's second book is Inadvertent Escalation: Conventional War and Nuclear Risks, which was published by Cornell University Press in 1991.

Restraint
Posen's third book is Restraint: A New Foundation for U.S. Grand Strategy, which was published as part of the Cornell Studies in Security Affairs series in 2014. The book is about two competing American grand strategies: liberal hegemony (which Posen opposes) and restraint (which Posen supports). Restraint contains Posen's critique of liberal hegemony and his explanation for why restraint is a superior grand strategy.

Reviewer William Ruger, writing in The American Conservative, called the book the "defining treatise" for supporters of restraint.

Notes

External links
Biography: Dr. Barry Posen
 Articles at Defense One
 Articles at Foreign Affairs
 Articles at National Interest
 Articles at JSTOR
A New Transatlantic Division of Labor could save Billions every year! by Barry Posen
The Transatlantic Relationship: Radical reform is in the U.S. National Interest by Barry Posen
Europe can defend itself by Barry Posen
Civil Wars & the Structure of World Power by Barry Posen
"We can Live With a Nuclear Iran" by Barry Posen in The New York Times

Living people
1952 births
RAND Corporation people
MIT School of Humanities, Arts, and Social Sciences faculty
University of California, Berkeley alumni
Occidental College alumni
Political realists